The "breast tax" (or  in Malayalam) was a head tax imposed on women belonging to Nadar, Ezhava and other lower caste communities by the Kingdom of Tranvancore (in present-day Kerala state of India). The term "breast tax" had nothing to do with breasts, instead, the term refers to a gender-specific tax levied from women.

According to subaltern beliefs the breast tax was imposed on lower class women if they covered their breasts. This belief has been questioned, as lower class women "were not allowed to wear upper garments in public" at all until 1859.

Head tax
They were expected to pay the tax when they became laborers, about the age of fourteen. The lower caste men had to pay a similar tax, called tala-karam, "moustache tax," independent from their wealth or income.

'Breast-cover tax'
The "breast tax" caught wider attention in 2016, when BBC reporter Divya Arya reported on a series of paintings by artist Murali T on the legend of Nangeli. The village legend of Nangeli is about a woman who lived in the early 19th century in Cherthala in the state of Travancore, and supposedly cut off her breasts in an effort to protest against the caste-based "breast tax." According to the legend, she cut off her breasts and presented them to the tax collector in a plantain leaf, then died of blood loss.

According to local beliefs, the "breast tax" was imposed on lower class women if they covered their breasts in public, to disencourage them from doing so.

These beliefs have been questioned, as lower class women "were not allowed to wear upper garments in public" at all until 1859, after the Channar revolt. Historian Manu Pillai treats the concept of "breast tax" to be a misnomer which "had nothing to do with breasts" and notes that covering the breasts was not the norm in Kerala's matrilineal society during Nangeli's life-span. Victorian standards of morality penetrated into the society decades later under British colonial influence, which led to subsequent class-struggles for the right to wear upper-body clothing. He believes Nangeli to have protested against an oppressive tax regime that was imposed upon all lower castes, which got appropriated with the passage of time, in pursuit of a different patriarchal fight for the preservation of female dignity.  In Jain's account, the "breast tax" is presented as a fine imposed by "Travancore's State's council of "upper" caste Nair's" to maintain caste boundaries.

Notes

References

Sources

Printed sources

Web sources

Caste system in India
Taxation in India
Kingdom of Travancore
Women of the Kingdom of Travancore